Colombian Postcards is a 2011 Colombian comedy film directed by Ricardo Coral.

References

External links
 

2011 films
2011 comedy films
2010s Spanish-language films
Colombian comedy films